Dražen Šćuri (born 7 January 1962) was commander of the Croatian Air Force and Air Defense from 2011 to 2016.

During his career he was the commander of an attack helicopter squadron, chief of the Operational duties section of the Air Force Command, and deputy Air Force commander.

References 

Croatian army officers
1962 births
Living people